Marvin Schlegel (born 2 January 1998) is a German track and field athlete. He competed in the mixed 4 × 400 metres relay event at the 2019 World Athletics Championships.

References

External links

1998 births
Living people
German male sprinters
World Athletics Championships athletes for Germany
German national athletics champions
Athletes (track and field) at the 2020 Summer Olympics
Olympic athletes of Germany
People from Frankenberg, Saxony